Ernest Corea (1932–11 May 2017) was a Sri Lankan journalist and a diplomat noted for his work to maintain a free and independent press and for negotiations involving Sri Lanka's development programs.

Early life

Corea was born in 1932 in Colombo, Ceylon.

His parents were Reverend Ivan Corea and Ouida Corea. His brother, Vernon, was a pioneering broadcaster with Radio Ceylon/SLBC and Ethnic Minorities Adviser to the BBC.  His father was Rural Dean of Colombo in the Church of Ceylon, Vicar of St. Luke's Church Borella and St. Paul's Church, Milagiriya.

His family hailed from the west coast town of Chilaw in Sri Lanka and were direct descendants of King Dominicus Corea, also known as Edirille Rala who was crowned King of Kotte and Sitawaka in 1596.

Corea was educated at the Royal College, Colombo and the University of Peradeniya.

Media

He was a journalist with the Lake House Group in Colombo, rising to the top as Editor of the Ceylon Daily News and The Ceylon Observer. Corea was appointed Features Editor and a Foreign Affairs Columnist at the Singapore Straits Times in the 1970s.

Diplomat

In April 1982 he was appointed Sri Lanka's High Commissioner in Canada and served as Sri Lanka's Ambassador to the United States, Cuba and Mexico. Corea presented his credentials to U.S. President Ronald Reagan at the White House, in Washington D.C. He spearheaded the first ever State Visit to the United States of a Sri Lankan Head of State when President Junius Richard Jayewardene was invited to the White House by President Reagan in 1984.

When he left the diplomatic service he joined the World Bank in Washington D.C. as a consultant. After retirement, he worked for IDN-InDepthNews and the Berlin-based Global Cooperation Council.

He died on 11 May 2017 at his home in Springfield, Virginia, USA.

See also 
Sri Lankan Non Career Diplomats
James Alfred Ernest Corea
List of political families in Sri Lanka

References

External links
The veterans were from Lake House

Sri Lankan journalists
Alumni of Royal College, Colombo
Ambassadors of Sri Lanka to the United States
Ambassadors of Sri Lanka to Cuba
Ambassadors of Sri Lanka to Mexico
High Commissioners of Sri Lanka to Canada
Ernest
1932 births
2017 deaths